Euphronarcha is a genus of moths in the family Geometridae. The genus was described by Warren in 1898.

Species 
 Euphronarcha coundularia Bastelberger 1907 
 Euphronarcha disperdita Walker 1860 
 Euphronarcha epiphloea (Turner, 1926)
 Euphronarcha hemipteraria Guenée 1857 
 Euphronarcha leptodesma (Meyrick, 1892)
 Euphronarcha luxaria (Guenée, 1857)

References

Boarmiini